The 1919–20 Hong Kong First Division League season was the 12th since its establishment.

Overview
HKFC won the title.

References
RSSSF

1919-20
1919–20 domestic association football leagues
1919 in Hong Kong
1920 in Hong Kong
Hong Kong
Hong Kong